The Jonckheer-Kroon cabinet, also called the Fourth Jonckheer cabinet was the 4th cabinet of the Netherlands Antilles.

Composition
The cabinet was composed as follows:

|rowspan="2"|Minister of General Affairs
|Efraïn Jonckheer
|DP
|12 October 1966
|-
|Ciro Domenico Kroon
|DP
|14 February 1968
|-
|Minister of Justice
|Ramez Jorge Isa
|DP
|12 October 1966
|-
|Minister of Finance
|Francisco Jose Tromp
|PPA
|12 October 1966
|-
|Minister of Constitutional Affairs and Education
|Hendrik S. Croes
|MEP
|12 October 1966
|-
|rowspan="2"|Minister of Social Affairs and Economic Affairs
|Ciro Domenico Kroon
|DP
|12 October 1966
|-
|Juan A.O. Bikker
|DP
|14 February 1968
|-
|rowspan="2"|Minister of Welfare
|Efraïn Jonckheer
|DP
|12 October 1966
|-
|Juan A.O. Bikker
|DP
|8 December 1966
|-
|rowspan="2"|Minister of Public Health 
|Ciro Domenico Kroon
|DP
|12 October 1966
|-
|Ernest Voges
|PNP
|16 August 1967
|-
|Minister of Traffic and Communications
|Julius R.L. Beaujon
|PPA
|12 October 1966
|}

References

Cabinets of the Netherlands Antilles
1966 establishments in the Netherlands Antilles
Cabinets established in 1966
Cabinets disestablished in 1969
1969 disestablishments in the Netherlands Antilles